Prieur is: 
 The French word for and derived from the Latin substantive Prior 

 A surname.  Notable people with this surname include: 
 Barthélemy  Prieur, a French sculptor
 Denis Prieur (more than one notable person has/had this name)
 Domaine Jacques Prieur
 Jean-Louis Prieur
 Jean-Luc Prieur
 Philippe Prieur
 Pierre Prieur
 Pierre Louis Prieur
 Sophie Prieur
 Yves le Prieur